Mariyam Nafees is a Pakistani television actress. She made her television debut in Hum TV's Diyar-e-Dil as Zarminey and later appeared as Tabinda in Kuch Na Kaho. her husband name

Career
Mariyam started her career in Diyar-e-Dil alongside Osman Khalid Butt, Maya Ali, Hareem Farooq, Abid Ali and Sanam Saeed. She played Zarminay as Suhaib (Ali Rehman Khan) and Arjumand (Hareem Farooq)'s youngest child and Wali (Osman Khalid Butt)'s youngest sister and the maternal granddaughter and great-niece of Bedaar Khan (Rasheed Naz) and Yasmeen (Azra Mansoor) through her mother Arjumand. Before her birth, her maternal grandparents died. But she still had her paternal grandfather Bakhtiar Khan (Abid Ali) through her father Sohaib.
Zarminay has a similar personality to that of her mother and remains with her most of the time. She loves Agha Jan and her family but was never introduced to her uncle Behroze (Mikaal Zulfiqar) family until her father's death. She respected Behroze and Wali, but hated Ruhina (Sanam Saeed) and Faarah (Maya Ali) and Agha Jan mostly gets ill due to their doings. Zarminay attended Faarah and Wali's marriage, she then later applied for a medical college degree and was also proposed by Ibad who happened to be Agha Jan's close friend's grandson. After Wali bought Faarah to the Haveli on their contract, Zarminay started ignoring her and once yelled at her looking to Agha Jan's health. However, after seeing Agha Jan's love and affection in Faarah's eyes, Zarminay apologized sincerely and the two bonded. She was then mostly seen with Faarah and decides to help her stay in the Haveli and make Wali understand her true feelings.

In Haya Ke Daaman Main, she appeared in the role of Rija as the friend of Haya (Sukaina Khan), main protagonist. She was often spotted at Haya's house and their friendship is non-understandable by Haya's family. While, Haya has 2 brothers Friad and Arish (who is to marry Mizna (Nida Khan), daughter of Behroze Sabzwari and Lina ( Shans sister) who is married to Farid . Haya's family is big. Haya tries to scare Rija with a turtle. Haya's father (Muhammad Qavi Khan) likes their friendship. Haya has not control on her talking, she talks as she thinks but her mother (Fouzia Mushtaq) makes her aware from scaring Rija and talking without thinking. Mizna's aunt Anwari (Afshan Qureshi) enters their house as her niece is about to marry Aarish. Rija falls on floor. Aarish pushes her foot in order to provide cure to her pain. Anwari sees her and immediately gets out of their house to convince her sister and brother-in-law to refuse the relationship and wedding preparations. Friad ( Haya and Arish's big brother) wants her to marry Shan (Lina's brother) but his family already got her married to Babar .

Television

References

External links
 
 

Living people
Pakistani female models
Pakistani television actresses
21st-century Pakistani actresses
Year of birth missing (living people)